Cem Özer (born 5 October 1959) is a Turkish actor. He appeared in more than thirty films since 1976.

Books 
 Yastıkaltı Hikayeleri, Neden Kitap Publishing,
 A! Cem'i Yazılar, Parantez Publishing, March 1997, 
 Yirmidört Saat (Film scenario), 1976

Filmography 
 O Hayat Benim – (2016–2017) – Kenan
 Sen Benimsin – 2015 – Kudret
 Buyur Burdan Kaç – 2013 – Istanbul Theater "director"
 Acayip Hikayeler – 2012
 Kadri'nin Götürdüğü Yere Git – 2009
 Sıcak – 2008
 Adem'in Trenleri – 2007 
 Bir İhtimal Daha Var – 2006 
 Sen Ne Dilersen – 2005 
 Masum Değiliz – 2005 
 3. Tür – 2004 
 Melekler Adası – 2004 
 Neredesin Firuze – 2003 
 Şıh Senem – 2003 
 90-60-90 – 2001 
 Ölüm Peşimizde – 2000 
 Aşkın Dağlarda Gezer – 1999 
 Asansör – 1999 
 Karışık Pizza – 1998 
 Usta Beni Öldürsene – 1996 
 Berlin in Berlin – 1993 
 Varyemez – 1991 
 Anılar – 1989 
 Zirvenin Bedeli – 1989 
 Hanım – 1988 
 Umutların Ötesi – 1988 
 Vurmayın – 1987 
 Menekşeler Mavidir – 1987 
 Güldürme Beni – 1986 
 Dayak Cennetten Çıkma – 1986 
 Hababam Sınıfı Güle Güle - 1981 
 Yirmidört Saat'' – 1976

References

External links 

1959 births
Turkish people of Abkhazian descent
Turkish people of Chechen descent
Living people
Turkish male film actors